The 14th Cuban National Series was won by Agricultores, a team from Havana. The short (39-game) season coincided with the first Selective Series, a sort of domestic all-star league for Cuban baseball players.

Standings

References

 (Note - text is printed in a white font on a white background, depending on browser used.)

Cuban National Series seasons
Base
Base
1975 in baseball